Roses Bloom Twice is a 1978 Australian television film about a woman's attempts to begin life again.

It was produced by Robert Bruning's Gemini Productions. Most of Gemini's TV movies were thrillers, but this one and The Alternative were melodramas.

Plot 
Diana is widowed and must face life alone.

Cast
Glynis McNicoll as Diana
Diane Craig
John Allen as Gabe
Michael Craig as Frank
Jennifer West 		
Lyndon Harris 		
Frank Taylor 		
James Moss 		
Reg Gillam 		
Alister Smart 		
Else Baring

References

External links

Roses Bloom Twice at Screen Australia
Roses Bloom Twice at National Film and Sound Archive

Australian television films
1978 television films
1978 films
1970s English-language films
1970s Australian films